Maurício de Oliveira Anastácio (born September 20, 1962, in Sorocaba), also known as Maurício, is a former Brazilian footballer who played as a forward.

Maurício is better known for his goal against Flamengo in the 1989 Campeonato Carioca final, ending a 21-year drought for Botafogo.

Honours
 Campeonato Carioca in 1989 with Botafogo
 Campeonato Gaúcho in 1992 with Internacional
 Copa do Brasil in 1992 with Internacional

References

External links

1962 births
Brazilian footballers
Brazilian expatriate footballers
Brazil international footballers
Association football midfielders
Living people
Sport Club Internacional players
America Football Club (RJ) players
Botafogo de Futebol e Regatas players
Grêmio Foot-Ball Porto Alegrense players
Associação Portuguesa de Desportos players
Londrina Esporte Clube players
Expatriate footballers in South Korea
Expatriate footballers in Spain
Ulsan Hyundai FC players
K League 1 players
Esporte Clube XV de Novembro (Piracicaba) players
RC Celta de Vigo players
Brazilian expatriate sportspeople in South Korea
Footballers from Rio de Janeiro (city)